Falah Hassan (born 1 July 1951) is a former Iraqi international football player, and current president of Al-Zawraa Sport Club in Baghdad.

Early life
Falah Hassan was born in 1951 in the village of Mimouna, in a district of Qal'at Saleh. His father was a farmer and after the 1958 Revolution, his family moved to Al-Thawra (now Al-Sadr) in the Iraqi capital Baghdad, taking advantage of the new government’s initiative in building low cost housing for families wanting to move to Baghdad, it was there he first played the game on the streets of the city.

During the 1970s, Falah Hassan was seen as one of the greatest players in Asia, and was offered lucrative contracts to play professionally abroad, in 1978 he received two offers one from Belgium and the other from the Emirates. Al-Shaab from the UAE reportedly offered Falah and teammate Ali Kadhim a contract to play for them in 1978, while after the arrival of Belgium’s army team in Baghdad, the delegation nearly reached an agreement for a move to a club in Belgium however the officials at the Iraqi FA turned it down saying that Falah Hassan was a national treasure, and that he should not be sold abroad. A year earlier in a dire 0–0 draw with English club Derby County in Baghdad, the player ran rings around the opposition defence.

After a dispute with the Iraq FA that led to a suspension from the national side in 1978, Falah returned the following year to guide Iraq to their first Gulf Cup victory, and then went on to lift the 1979 CISM World Military Championship in Kuwait, beating Italy 4–3 on penalties.

Career statistics

International goals
Scores and results list Iraq's goal tally first.

Post-playing career
Falah Hassan has been the president of Al-Zawraa SC since 2010. The club has been into lots of success under Hassan's regime, winning many trophies and playing in Asian competitions.

See also
 List of men's footballers with 100 or more international caps

References

External links 
The Legends Training page at Soccer City of Shelby Township.

1951 births
Living people
Al-Zawraa SC players
Iraqi footballers
1976 AFC Asian Cup players
Footballers at the 1980 Summer Olympics
Olympic footballers of Iraq
Iraq international footballers
People from Maysan Governorate
Association football forwards
FIFA Century Club
Footballers at the 1974 Asian Games
Al-Zawraa SC managers
Iraqi football managers
Asian Games competitors for Iraq